Dandin (Arabic: دندن ) is a music platform and sound-hosting website for the Middle East. Established in Egypt in October 2013, Dandin is a platform that focusses on highlighting emerging talent from the region.

History 

Dandin.me was launched on October 10, 2013, as an independent audio platform based in Egypt. It invites users to upload recordings in different sections, such as music, comedy, podcasts, politics and poetry.

Origin of Name 

Dandin is an Egyptian-Arabic slang term for humming and being a Middle Eastern platform it hosts output from artists originating only from that region.

Sound types and genres 

The platform hosts a variety of sounds derived from what is labelled the independent or alternative scene in the Middle East. Besides music it  also hosts poetry, comedy sketches, political rants and storytelling.

References

External links 

2013 establishments in Egypt
Arabic-language websites
Digital audio distributors
Internet properties established in 2013